Hiram Kyle Davies (born September 9, 1983) is an American former professional baseball pitcher. He has also played in MLB for the Atlanta Braves and Kansas City Royals.

Davies grew up in Stockbridge, Georgia, and graduated from Stockbridge High School and signed right out of high school with the Braves. He made his MLB debut in 2005, and was traded to the Royals in 2007. Injuries prevented him from appearing in MLB after the 2011 season, until he pitched for the Yankees in 2015.

Career
Davies attended Stockbridge High School in Stockbridge, Georgia. He was highly recruited by many major college programs, most notably Georgia Tech.

Atlanta Braves
The Atlanta Braves selected Davies in the fourth round of the 2001 Major League Baseball draft, and Davies signed rather than attend college. Davies was a member of the Rome Braves during their inaugural season, when they won the 2003 South Atlantic League championship. He led the team in strikeouts with 148 during that season. Davies was part of the group of rookie players nicknamed the "Baby Braves" that Atlanta called up from its minor league system during the 2005 season. Davies made his Major League Baseball debut on May 21, 2005, a rainy night at Fenway Park in Boston, Massachusetts, and dominated six innings against the Boston Red Sox. Braves pitchers John Thomson and Mike Hampton were both put on the disabled list with injuries, and Davies was called up. Davies immediately made an impact, as he did not allow a run in his first three starts in the Major Leagues. When Thomson and Hampton returned to the pitching rotation in August, Davies was sent back to the minor leagues. Davies began the 2006 season as a starter in Atlanta, after coming to spring training as a probable Class AAA starter.

On May 15, 2006, Davies suffered an injury to his right groin while pitching against the Florida Marlins. He was later diagnosed with a torn groin muscle and underwent surgery several days later. As a result of the injury, Davies was put on the disabled list and missed 10 weeks of the season. He ended up making only 14 starts in 2006, with a very poor earned run average (ERA) of 8.38. Out of spring training in 2007, Davies was initially assigned to the Richmond Braves of the Class AAA International League. However, due to the injury of Lance Cormier at the end of spring training, he was promoted at the beginning of the year to fill Cormier's spot. Cormier's inability to return to form after rehabilitating and coming off the DL, coupled with the Braves losing Mike Hampton to season ending surgery, allowed Davies role on the pitching staff to cease being a fill-in role. However, in 17 starts, Davies had a terrible time establishing any pattern of reliability and consistency, posting a record of 4–8 with a 5.76 ERA. In a start on July 16 versus the Cincinnati Reds, Davies threw just 22 pitches and did not record an out before being taken out of the game. Consequently, Davies was optioned to Richmond on July 19 as rookie Jo-Jo Reyes assumed his spot in the rotation.

Kansas City Royals
On July 31, 2007, Davies was traded to the Kansas City Royals in exchange for pitcher Octavio Dotel. On August 4, Davies made his Royals debut going three innings and giving up five earned runs. He also gave up Alex Rodriguez's 500th homer in the first inning. But on August 9 he was able to bounce back with 6 and 2/3 scoreless innings against the Minnesota Twins, giving up only 3 hits and striking out 4. The Royals won the game by the score of 2–0. On August 1, 2011, Davies was placed on the 15-day disabled list with right shoulder impingement. He was released on August 10, 2011, and cleared release waivers on August 12.

Toronto Blue Jays
On August 20, Davies signed a minor league contract with the Toronto Blue Jays.

Minnesota Twins
On February 20, 2013, Davies signed a minor league contract with the Minnesota Twins. After missing April and half of May due to shoulder problems, Davies was assigned to High-A Fort Myers, where he made his first start on May 15. After one additional start, he missed another month due to injury, making a rehab start with the GCL Twins before returning to Fort Myers, where he made 3 more starts. On July 23, Davies was promoted to Double-A New Britain, where he made 7 starts to finish the season. In 12 starts in 2013, Davies went 4–3 with a 3.41 ERA and 4 quality starts, striking out 47 in 58 innings.

Cleveland Indians
Davies signed a minor league deal with the Cleveland Indians on February 12, 2014.

New York Yankees
Davies signed a minor league deal with the New York Yankees on February 10, 2015. He was called up to the major leagues on April 12, 2015, and appeared in a game that night. He was designated for assignment by the Yankees the next day.

Tokyo Yakult Swallows
Davies signed with the Tokyo Yakult Swallows of Nippon Professional Baseball for the 2016 season.

Somerset Patriots
On May 7, 2018, Davies signed with the Somerset Patriots of the Atlantic League of Professional Baseball. He became a free agent following the 2018 season.

Lancaster Barnstormers
On March 15, 2019, Davies signed with the Lancaster Barnstormers of the Atlantic League of Professional Baseball. He became a free agent following the season.

Personal life
During the offseason, Davies works for his father's construction company. He currently resides in McDonough, Georgia.

Kyle's younger brother Jake played baseball at Georgia Tech from 2009 to 2012 and signed with the Boston Red Sox organization. He reached the Class–A New York–Penn League later that year, but was released in 2013.

Davies was arrested in St. Petersburg, Florida after a baseball game on August 8, 2011, for disorderly intoxication.

References

External links

1983 births
Living people
Atlanta Braves players
Kansas City Royals players
New York Yankees players
Gulf Coast Braves players
Macon Braves players
Danville Braves players
Rome Braves players
Myrtle Beach Pelicans players
Greenville Braves players
Richmond Braves players
Mississippi Braves players
Omaha Royals players
Omaha Storm Chasers players
Lancaster Barnstormers players
Las Vegas 51s players
Gulf Coast Twins players
Fort Myers Miracle players
New Britain Rock Cats players
Akron RubberDucks players
Columbus Clippers players
Azucareros del Este players
American expatriate baseball players in the Dominican Republic
Major League Baseball pitchers
People from Decatur, Georgia
People from Stockbridge, Georgia
Baseball players from Georgia (U.S. state)
Tokyo Yakult Swallows players
Somerset Patriots players
American expatriate baseball players in Japan